Lawrence J. Block (born March 15, 1951) is a former judge of the United States Court of Federal Claims who was confirmed on October 2, 2002. He retired on January 8, 2016.

Education and career 
Judge Block received a Bachelor of Science degree from New York University in 1973, graduating magna cum laude. He received his Juris Doctor degree from The John Marshall Law School in 1982, and after law school he clerked for the Honorable Roger J. Miner, United States District Court Judge for the Northern District of New York. Mr. Block served as an adjunct professor at the George Mason University School of Law from 1990–91.

From 1983–1986, Block was an associate with the New York office of Skadden, Arps, Slate, Meagher & Flom, where his substantive areas of practice included constitutional claims involving Commerce Clause and Commercial Speech issues, financial services litigation, as well as merger and acquisition, securities, labor and administrative law litigation.

From 1986 to 1990, Block was an attorney in the U.S. Department of Justice. Block started out as a litigation attorney in the Department’s Commercial Litigation Branch, and then from 1987–1990, Judge Block served as Senior Attorney-Advisor in the Office of Legal Policy and Policy Development, where he specialized in constitutional law, particularly in the areas of federalism, takings law, separation of powers, presidential power and foreign affairs issues.  He also worked extensively on regulatory and environmental issues, particularly with the White House on the Bush Administration's Clean Air Act proposal.

From 1994–2002, Judge Block served as senior counsel to the Senate Judiciary Committee, where he worked on a number of significant issues including property rights legislation, punitive damages and class action court reform bills, the cost-benefit analysis regulatory reform act, tobacco policy, litigation and arbitration policy, and First Amendment, privacy and attendant constitutional issues arising out of high technology legislation and governmental programs.

Federal judicial service 
Block was nominated by George W. Bush on September 4, 2001, to a seat vacated by Eric G. Bruggink on the United States Court of Federal Claims. He was confirmed by the United States Senate on October 2, 2002, and received commission on October 3, 2002. He retired from active service on January 8, 2016.

Publications 
In 1987, Judge Block was awarded the Attorney General's Special Achievement Award for an article entitled "A New Look At Plurality Decisions", which was published in March 1988.

Personal life
Born in New York City, and a resident of Connecticut and New Jersey, Judge Block has resided in Alexandria, Virginia, over the last sixteen years.

References

External links 
 

1951 births
Living people
21st-century American judges
George Mason University faculty
Judges of the United States Court of Federal Claims
Lawyers from New York City
New York (state) lawyers
New York University alumni
Skadden, Arps, Slate, Meagher & Flom people
United States Article I federal judges appointed by George W. Bush
United States Department of Justice lawyers